John Glen (born 15 May 1932) is a retired English film director and editor. He is best known for his work on the James Bond series, firstly by editing a number of earlier James Bond films and then later moving on to direct a further five Bond films in the franchise.

Life and career
Glen had his start in the film-making industry as a messenger boy in 1945. By the late 1940s, he was working in the visual and sound editorial departments of Shepperton Studios for films produced by Alexander Korda, such as The Third Man (1949) and The Wooden Horse (1950). Moving up the ranks, Glen made his picture editorial debut on a documentary series titled Chemistry for Six Forms in 1961, and his directorial debut on the TV series Man in a Suitcase in 1968 (directing the episode "Somebody Loses, Somebody ... Wins?").

During the 1960s and 1970s, Glen served as a film editor and second unit director, working on such films as Superman (1978) and The Wild Geese (1978); he also contributed to three James Bond films: On Her Majesty's Secret Service (1969), The Spy Who Loved Me (1977) and Moonraker (1979). Following the release of Moonraker, Glen was promoted to the rank of official director of the series; he went on to direct all five Bond films of the 1980s. He holds the record for directing the most number of films in the series to date, just one film more than Guy Hamilton. The films are:

For Your Eyes Only (1981)
Octopussy (1983)
A View to a Kill (1985)
The Living Daylights (1987)
Licence to Kill (1989)

After Bond, Glen continued to direct, with credits including Christopher Columbus: The Discovery (1992) and The Point Men (2001). He also directed episodes of the science-fiction television series Space Precinct (1994–95). In 2001, he published his memoir, For My Eyes Only.

Directorial style
Glen's films contain a recurring motif in the form of a startled pigeon that makes the actor (as well as the audience) jump; it is especially noticeable in his five James Bond films. Variations exist; in some cases, the animal is a cat (A View to a Kill) or a monkey (The Living Daylights). As editor of Moonraker, Glen was responsible for creating the "double-taking pigeon", an editing trick that makes it appear as if a bird in St Mark's Square in Venice cannot believe its eyes when Bond's (Roger Moore) gondola transforms into a hovercraft. In addition, all of Glen's Bond films feature a character who dies by falling from a height, in a sequence commonly accompanied by the same "male scream" sound effect.

Glen often re-used actors in his films. In his autobiography, he states that he wanted to cast Timothy Dalton in Christopher Columbus: The Discovery but that Dalton left the project before shooting commenced; Glen wonders whetherfollowing an argument at the end of shooting on Licence to KillDalton did not wish to appear in any more of his films. Several other cast members from the Glen Bond films appear in Christopher Columbus: the Discovery; among them are Robert Davi (who played Franz Sanchez in Licence to Kill), Benicio del Toro (who played Dario in Licence to Kill), and Michael Gothard (who played Emile Leopold Locque in For Your Eyes Only). 

By far his most frequent acting collaborator was Roger Moore, who worked with Glen on eleven films.

Filmography

References

External links

John Glen Biography on the "007 James" website (Retrieved 27 August 2012)
John Glen Biography on the "MI6 The Home of James Bond 007" website (Retrieved 27 August 2012)
You Only Live Splice: The Editing of John Glen documentary on John Glen's editing style on the "James Bond Radio" website.

1932 births
Living people
20th-century English people
21st-century English memoirists
Action film directors
English film directors
English film editors
English-language film directors
English male non-fiction writers
English television directors
English television editors
People from Sunbury-on-Thames